Tracie Peterson (born 1959) is an author of Christian fiction.  She writes many historical novels, with romantic threads in them, as well as writing with other Christian authors on joint novels.  Many of her books are published by Bethany House.  She originally used the pen name of Janelle Jamison.

Several of her series feature Harvey Girls, who are historically part of the Fred Harvey Company.

Peterson is married to Jim and has 3 children, Jennifer, Julie, and Erik; they live in Montana.

Peterson owns Peterson Ink, Inc. along with her husband Jim, daughter Jennifer, and friend Charity Kauffman. Barbour Publishing uses Peterson Ink to handle the entire production of their Heartsong Presents book line. Heartsong Presents publishes 52 Christian romance books a year, with half of those being contemporary stories and half historical.

List of works

Ribbons of Steel series 
written with Judith Pella and published by Bethany House

 Distant Dreams, 1997
 A Hope Beyond, 1997
 A Promise for Tomorrow, 1998

Ribbons West series 
written with Judith Pella

 Westward the Dream, 1999
 Separate Roads, 1999
 Ties that Bind, 2000

This is a continuation to the Ribbons of Steel series.

Westward Chronicles series 
published by Bethany House.  This series featured the Harvey Girls in each book.

 A Shelter of Hope, 1998
 Hidden in a Whisper, 1999
 A Veiled Reflection, 2000

This series was repackaged in 2005 by the publisher.

Shannon Saga series 
Written with James Scott Bell and published by Bethany House.  The story of Kit Shannon, a lawyer, in Los Angeles in the 20th century.

 City of Angels, 2001
 Angels Flight, 2001
 Angel of Mercy, 2002

Yukon Quest series 
Published by Bethany House: "The late 1800s offered the brave and the desperate an opportunity to flee the world they'd known for the lure of gold in the vast expanses of Alaska."

 Treasures of the North, 2001
 Ashes and Ice, 2001
 Rivers of Gold, 2002

Desert Roses series
Published by Bethany House: "Delight in the Intrigue and Romance of the Harvey Girls of the Old West"

 Shadows of the Canyon, 2002
 Across the Years, 2003
 Beneath a Harvest Sky, 2003

Bells of Lowell series 
Written with Judith Miller, published by Bethany House: "Bringing the late 19th-century mill town of Lowell, Massachusetts, to life in a fascinating slice of history."

 Daughter of the Loom, 2003
 A Fragile Design, 2003
 These Tangled Threads, 2003

Lights of Lowell series 
Written with Judith Miller, published by Bethany House: "Courage, faith, and love are at the heart of this moving saga of a young woman’s stand for what she knows is right."

 A Tapestry of Hope, 2004
 A Love Woven True, 2005
 The Pattern of her Heart, 2005

Heirs of Montana series 
Published by Bethany House: "a one-of-a-kind portrait of 1860s Montana and the strong, spirited men and women who dared to call it home."

 Land of my Heart, 2004
 The Coming Storm, 2004
 To Dream Anew, 2004
 The Hope Within, 2005

Alaskan Quest series 
Published by Bethany House: "a captivating cast of characters struggles to survive in America's final frontier. The adventure begins when the quiet lives of siblings Jacob and Leah Barringer are interrupted by a familiar face from the past and a stranger with a mysterious mission."

 Summer of the Midnight Sun, 2006
 Under the Northern Lights, 2006
 Whispers of the Winter, 2006

This series continues a focus on the characters from the Yukon Quest series.

Ladies of Liberty series 
Published by Bethany House: "centered in the bustling, energetic city of Philadelphia; each book an independent read, these novels will feature winsom heroines engaged in unusual careers for the time"

 A Lady of High Regard, 2007
 A Lady of Hidden Intent, 2008
 A Lady of Secret Devotion, 2008

Broadmoor Legacy series 
Written with Judith Miller, published by Bethany House: "a heart-stirring series featuring three young women searching for love and a legacy the 1890s."

 A Daughter's Inheritance, 2008
 An Unexpected Love, 2008
 A Surrendered Heart, 2009

Brides of Gallatin County series 
Published by Bethany House: "the story of three sisters running a roadhouse in the Montana Territory"

 A Promise to Believe In, 2008
 A Love to Last Forever, 2009
 A Dream to Call My Own, 2009

Song of Alaska series 
Published by Bethany House

 Dawn's Prelude, 2009
 Morning's Refrain, 2010
 Twilight's Serenade, 2010

Bridal Veil Island Series
 To Have and to Hold (with Judith Miller)
 To Love and Cherish (with Judith Miller)
 To Honor and Trust  (with Judith Miller)

Land of the Lone Star Series
 Chasing the Sun, 2012
 Touching the Sky, 2012
 Taming the Wind, 2012

Land of Shining Water – from Bethany House
 The Icecutter’s Daughter (2013)
 The Quarryman’s Bride (2013)
 The Miner’s Lady (2013)

Lone Star Brides – from Bethany House
 A Sensible Arrangement (2014)
 A Moment in Time (2014)
 A Matter of Heart (2014)
Lone Star Brides – Books 1-3 (2015)

Sapphire Brides Series – from Bethany House
 A Treasure Concealed (2016)
 A Beauty Refined (2016)
 A Love Transformed (2016)

Golden Gate Secrets – from Bethany House
 In Places Hidden Book 1 (2018)
 In Dreams Forgotten Book 2 (2018)
 In Times Gone By Book 3 (2018)

Brookstone Brides Series – from Bethany House
 When You Are Near Book 1 (2019)
 Wherever You Go Book 2 (2019)
 What Comes My Way Book 3 (2019)

Brides of Seattle Series – from Bethany House 

 Steadfast Heart (2015)
 Refining Fire (2015)
 Love Everlasting (2015)

The Heart of Alaska Series – from Bethany House 
 In the Shadow of Denali (2017)
 Out of the Ashes (2018)
 Under the Midnight Sun (2019)

Heart of the Frontier Series – from Bethany House 
 Treasured Grace (2017)
 Beloved Hope (2017)
 Cherished Mercy (2017)

Standalone books 

 Entangled, published by Bethany House, 1997
 Framed, published by Bethany House, 1998
 Seasons of Love, published by Barbour Publishing, 1998
 Alaska, published by Barbour Publishing, 1998
 Controlling Interests, published by Bethany House, 1998
 Celebration of Life, published by Barbour Publishing, 1999
 A Slender Thread, published by Bethany House, 2000
 Tidings of Peace, published by Bethany House, 2000
 Colorado Wings, published by Barbour Publishing, 2000
 Kansas, with Judith McCoy Miller and published by Barbour Publishing, 2001
 The Long-awaited Child, published by Bethany House, 2001
 New Mexico Sunset, published by Barbour Publishing, 2001
 New Mexico Sunrise, published by Barbour Publishing, 2001
 Julotta, 2002
 Eyes of the Heart (nonfiction), published by Bethany House, 2002
 Silent Star, published by Bethany House, 2003
 Castles, published by Barbour Publishing, 2004
 What She Left for Me, published by Bethany House, 2005
 I Can't Do It All, with Allison Bottke and Dianne O'Brian, published by Bethany House, 2006
 One More Sunrise , with Michael Landon Jr. and published by Bethany House, 2007
 Where My Heart Belongs, published by Bethany House, 2007

Heartsong Presents books 
These are standalone Christian Romance novels from the Heartsong Presents company.

 A Place to Belong (Heartsong 19) as Janelle Jamison
 If Given a Choice (Heartsong 102)
 A Kingdom Divided (Heartsong 111), 1995
 The Hearts Calling (Heartsong 116)
 Forever Yours (Heartsong 127)
 Angel's Cause (Heartsong 140)
 Alas My Love (Heartsong 164)
 A Wing and a Prayer (Heartsong 182), 1996
 Wings Like Eagles (Heartsong 186)
 Come Away, My Love (Heartsong 195), 1996
 If Only (Heartsong 200)
 My Valentine (Heartsong 211)
 Wings of the Dawn, (Heartsong 226), 1997
 Logan's Lady, (Heartsong 239), 1997
 Crossroads, (Heartsong 245), 1997
 The House on Windridge (Heartsong 287), 1998
 Five Geese Flying (Heartsong 259), 1998

Heartsong Book Collection
 An Old Fashion Christmas - 4 short stories, one of them is by Tracie Peterson

External links 
 traciepeterson.com, personal site
 Bethany House listing of books
 Heartsong Presents: Tracie Peterson
 Barbour Publishing: Tracie Peterson
 Fantastic Fiction: Tracie Peterson

Christian writers
1959 births
Living people
20th-century American novelists
21st-century American novelists
American historical novelists
American women novelists
Fred Harvey Company
20th-century American women writers
21st-century American women writers
Women historical novelists
Pseudonymous women writers
20th-century pseudonymous writers
21st-century pseudonymous writers